The Man Show is an American comedy television show on Comedy Central that aired from 1999 to 2004. It was created in 1999 by its two original co-hosts, Adam Carolla and Jimmy Kimmel, and their executive producer Daniel Kellison. The pilot was originally paid for and pitched to ABC, who declined to pick up the show.

The Man Show simultaneously celebrated and lampooned the stereotypical loutish male perspective in a sexually charged, humorous light. The show consisted of a variety of pre-recorded comedy sketches and live in-studio events, usually requiring audience participation.

The Man Show is particularly well known for its buxom female models, the Juggy Dance Squad, who would dance in themed, revealing costumes at the opening of every show, in the aisles of the audience just before The Man Show went to commercial break, and during the end segment "Girls on Trampolines".

The first year of The Man Show featured beer-guzzling entertainer Bill 'The Fox' Foster as the show's emcee. Foster specialized in chugging two beers in record time (sometimes while suspended upside down) and singing lewd drinking songs. He would close every episode by leading the audience in the German drinking toast Zicke, Zacke, Zicke, Zacke, Hoi, Hoi, Hoi!, a tradition that the show continued after his death from prostate cancer in 2000.

Episodes

Notable segments

 One skit featured Carolla and Kimmel setting up a booth at a farmer's market and successfully asking people to sign a petition to "end women's suffrage", demanding the repeal of the 19th Amendment (which guarantees women's voting rights; the amendment was ratified in 1920). This sketch humorously revealed widespread fundamental political ignorance in the general population and how terminology could be used to manipulate public opinion. The majority of people who came to the booth, both men and women, were willing to sign the petition.
 A hidden-camera prank showed Carolla and Kimmel, dressed as hunters, tying an animatronic deer to the roof of a car, parked at a truck stop, using the deer to prank unsuspecting passersby. Carolla and Kimmel hid in a van parked nearby, making the deer move and talk, asking people to untie it, and even asking a police officer to shoot it.
 The Man Show tribute to The Benny Hill Show
 There were several hidden-camera segments featuring "The Man Show Boy" Aaron Hamill, who was 11 years old at that time. One skit had him standing outside a liquor store asking customers to buy him beer, while in another he walked around on a beach hitting on women. He made one-liners, which always caught people he approached off-guard. An episode featured him walking around with a puppy. When a man stopped to pet the dog, he told him, "I just use him to get girls. Unfortunately, I've been attracting gay guys all day though." Another notable skit by Aaron Hamill took place outside, with his running a beer stand. Similar to the classic lemonade stand, the boy set up in the middle of a public sidewalk, trying to sell beer  instead of lemonade, to pedestrians. He grabbed attention of many people, using foul language and savage behavior, including a line telling a woman: "Okay listen, Hitler, there's no German beer here, so move along" as she was stating her opinion on the boy's illegal selling of alcohol, and telling a couple that the boyfriend should drink both beers so his girlfriend would look better.
 The hosts visited Snoop Dogg's house, where they messed around with him in his recording studio, as well as getting stoned with him off-screen in his "Green Room".
 One recurring skit featured Kimmel's impression of former Utah Jazz star Karl Malone. Kimmel would appear in blackface make-up while wearing a bald cap and body suit, filmed at an angle which made it look like Kimmel (who is much shorter in real life than Malone) was very tall, and dole out advice on subjects such as history, health, and China. The impression pokes fun at Malone's well-known inarticulacy, and Kimmel's impression strongly implied that Malone was stupid, reliant on having the "Jamz" star player repeat himself constantly, refer to himself in the third person, speak in an odd Southern accent, and throw in a large number of double negatives.
 The 1999, 2000, and 2001 seasons occasionally featured segments titled "The Monkey Bar", where chimpanzees duplicated real-life human exploits in a similar style to that of the 1970s American Broadcasting Company program Lancelot Link, Secret Chimp. One such performance entailed a conversation in a bar which referred to a penguin joke. In another, (not in the Monkey Bar setting) Jimmy Kimmel sent his (then) wife, Gina, to Poland in order to allow him to be with his new "simian wife", referred to by his real-life children as "monkey mommy".
 "The Wheel of Destiny", a recurring segment based on the chance to receive either pain or pleasure resulting from the spin of a wheel. Good prizes included a ride in the 1960s Batmobile with Adam West, a wheelbarrow full of porn, a celebrity who would pretend to be their friend (Gary Busey), and eating a candy bra off a porn star. Bad prizes included "Adam pees on your wallet", "Shave your eyebrows", "Forklift Wedgie", and "Call your mommy and admit that you masturbate".

Departure of Kimmel and Carolla
In 2003, Kimmel and Carolla left The Man Show, with the hosting jobs passed down to comedians Joe Rogan and Doug Stanhope. With the hosting change came a re-composition of the show's theme song. The new pair hosted the show for two more seasons before it ceased production in 2004, after its final episode aired on June 19.

Post-series
Kimmel went on to host his own late-night show for ABC, Jimmy Kimmel Live!, which he has hosted since 2003. Carolla stayed with Comedy Central to host Too Late with Adam Carolla in 2005 and then became part of CBS Radio's Free FM experiment after Howard Stern joined Sirius Satellite Radio; his talk show, The Adam Carolla Show, ran until 2009. Carolla continues to do the show as a daily podcast and also co-hosted the Spike show Catch a Contractor. Carolla has appeared on Kimmel's program several times (more so than any other guest) during its run.

Rogan continued to host Fear Factor for three more years after The Man Show was cancelled and eventually became color commentator for the Ultimate Fighting Championship, with which he has been associated since its early days. He also continues to tour as a standup comedian and began a podcast in 2012, eventually featuring influential in-depth interviews that frequently run three hours. Stanhope continues to perform philosophical standup comedy, hosts a podcast in Arizona, and remains one of Rogan's most frequent podcast guests.

In 2012, for the season 4, episode 29 of Tosh.0, titled "Virgin Trampoline Jumper", Daniel Tosh revisited The Man Show with hosts Joe Rogan and Doug Stanhope, in which they made the claim that the show still gets filmed. The hosts gave advice for a man who was 37 and still a virgin; they then set him up with a Juggy Girl.

In October 2017, several clips from the series began to resurface, including clips of Kimmel's impersonations of Karl Malone. It wasn't until June 2020 that Kimmel issued an apology for the Karl Malone sketches in the wake of the George Floyd protests. "There is nothing more important to me than your respect, and I apologize to those who were genuinely hurt or offended by the makeup I wore or the words I spoke," Kimmel said in a statement, adding that he never realized that it could be viewed as more than "an imitation of a human being."

Notable Juggy Girls
 Paula Harrison
 Christy Hemme - American professional wrestler and WWE Diva
 Vanessa Kay
 Joanna Krupa
 Candice Michelle - American professional wrestler and WWE Diva
 Nicole Pulliam

Syndication and DVDs
In the late 2000s, reruns of The Man Show aired on G4TV weeknights at 10:00 p.m. ET and 10:30 p.m. ET, and on Saturdays at 12:00 a.m. ET. It was originally thought that the Rogan-Stanhope-era episodes would not be shown because the commercials referred to the syndicated episodes as "the way Jimmy and Adam made it". However, Canadian channel mentv included the Rogan/Stanhope episodes in its schedule. G4TV also aired the Rogan-Stanhope episodes, but only a few times.

The first four seasons of The Man Show are also available on DVD.

International versions
A Norwegian version of The Man Show was aired on TV 2 Zebra in 2006 and 2007, and ran its third season in 2008.

In Denmark, there was a version called Penislægens værksted (The Penis-doctors workshop) on TV2-Zulu.

A Turkish version was adapted by Play Productions and aired on Star TV in 2000.

References

External links
 
 Comedy Central site
 Pazsaz Entertainment Network - Episode Information And Airdates
 

2004 American television series endings
1999 American television series debuts
1990s American satirical television series
1990s American sketch comedy television series
2000s American satirical television series
2000s American sketch comedy television series
Comedy Central original programming
English-language television shows
Television series by Lionsgate Television
Television series by Stone Stanley Entertainment
American television shows featuring puppetry